Endurance (207) is the lead ship of the Endurance-class landing platform dock of the Republic of Singapore Navy.

Development 
The navy's intention to purchase the Endurance-class was revealed by former Defence Minister Dr. Tony Tan during his visit to Tuas Naval Base on 3 August 1996. These ships were to replace the five ex-United States Navy (USN) County-class LSTs, which were acquired by Singapore from the United States in the 1970s. ST Marine was awarded the government contract to design and build the four ships – a significant milestone for the local defence and shipbuilding industries given the scale and extensiveness of the programme.

Construction and career
She was laid down on  27 March 1997 and launched on 14 March 1998. She was commissioned on 18 March 2000 with the hull number 207.

Endurance participated as both a compliant and non-compliant vessel for boarding teams during Exercise Sea Sabre in 2004 as part of the Proliferation Security Initiative.

RSS Endurance sailed to Aceh in Indonesia to deliver emergency supplies and medical personnel to aid in the relief efforts after a tsunami. She was then joined by Persistence on 4 January 2005 and Endeavour on 16 January.

RSS Endurance became the first RSN ship to circumnavigate the globe when it participated in the 6th USN International Naval Review in New York City, passing through both Panama and Suez Canal in 2000.

References

External links

Endurance-class landing platform docks
Ships built in Singapore
1998 ships